The Edison Theatre was a Broadway theatre located in the Hotel Edison at 240 West 47th Street in Midtown Manhattan. 

Originally opening in 1931 as the hotel's ballroom, it became the Arena Theatre on May 31, 1950, with a revival of George Kelly's The Show Off. The following year it was returned to the hotel's ballroom and remained as such until the early 1970s, when it was re-converted to a theatre. Its most notable production was Oh! Calcutta!, which opened on September 24, 1976, and ran for 13 years, with a total of 5,959 performances. Other shows staged here included Don't Bother Me, I Can't Cope, Me and Bessie, Sizwe Banzi is Dead, The Island, and Love Letters.

The theatre closed on February 24, 1991. Its final production was Those Were the Days, a musical revue celebrating Klezmer, featuring Bruce Adler, who was nominated for a Tony Award as Best Featured Actor in a Musical. In 1991, Maria DiDia, the Edison Theater General Manager, returned the property to the owners of the Edison Hotel, who promptly removed the theater seats and turned it back into its original art deco ballroom configuration.

References

External links

 
 Edison Hotel

Former theatres in Manhattan
Theater District, Manhattan